Geoffrey Lancelot Rutter Davis (died 3 October 2008) was an Australian doctor (1958 Bachelor of Medicine and Bachelor of Surgery (Faculty of Medicine alumni) a director of the International Abortion Research and Training Centre. and the owner of The Abbey in Annandale, Sydney, NSW. In the early 1960s Davis had two clinics in the Potts Point and Arncliffe suburbs of Sydney where he carried out discreet terminations up until 1971, when abortion was legalised in New South Wales. Though Davis was originally an anaesthetist, he is known for his work with late term abortions. Davis had worked with Population Services International, the International Fertility Research Program, and International Planned Parenthood Federation in the 1960s. Davis also did research on prior induced abortion.

Davis is best known for his work in performing late-term abortions following the mass rapes during the Bangladesh Liberation War. Davis worked in a victim relief programme in Dhaka in the year following the liberation war at the request of the World Health Organization and International Planned Parenthood Federation. In conjunction with Leonard Laufe, Davis set up "industrial scale procedures" of abortion in the year following the war. Between them they carried out 95 percent of terminations which had resulted from the mass rapes. Davis also travelled for months in remote areas to carry out terminations. Davis has estimated that at least 400,000 women and children had been raped by the Pakistani armed forces and their collaborators, the Al-Badr ("the moon") the Al-Shams ("the sun") and the Razakars. In addition to carrying out terminations Davis also worked with international adoption agencies in trying to find families for the children who were unwanted due to cultural beliefs. Davis died on 3 October 2008 in Australia.

References

Year of birth missing
2008 deaths
Australian obstetricians
Bangladesh Liberation War